The Martin Luther King Jr. Parkway is a  long expressway running along the eastern and northern edges of Downtown Jacksonville, Florida. It carries U.S. Route 1 Alternate (US 1 Alternate) from near its southern terminus to an interchange with US 1/US 17 (Main Street). US 1 follows the expressway to its northern terminus, an intersection with US 23. Despite its name, it is not a parkway in the conventional sense, as it has no limits on truck use and is not located near parks or other beautified areas.

Route description

The parkway begins just east of the Gator Bowl, near an interchange with State Route 10A (SR 10A) and SR 139 to the Mathews Bridge. Continuing north around downtown Jacksonville, the highway bends due west and intersects Interstate 95 (I-95). The route continues west for another mile before merging with US 23 (New Kings Road).

The entire length of the parkway is included as part of the National Highway System, a system of roadways important to the nation's economy, defense, and mobility.

History
Upon its completion in the early 1960s, the road was actually known by two names. The eastern portion, running due north from the base of the Matthews Bridge, was known as the Haines Street Expressway. The northern portion, running due west from the northern terminus of the Haines Expressway, was known as the 20th Street Expressway. Both sections took their respective names from the actual city streets that they either replaced or ran parallel to. The two roads were, in actual operation, a single road, providing a rapid, limited-access route from the Gator Bowl in the southeastern corner of downtown Jacksonville, to the northwestern residential reaches of downtown.

In 2000, the Jacksonville City Council voted to honor the murdered civil rights movement leader Martin Luther King Jr., by naming this route after him, and the change was effected on January 15, 2001, the 72nd anniversary of King's birth.  Jacksonville was one of the last major cities in the country to rename a road for Dr. King; by choosing this route, the city was able to pay homage and yet because the entire route is without any addresses, either residential or business, the council was able to avoid irritating constituents, as often happens with such name changes. For the same reason, the frontage roads are still named Haines Street.

Exit list

See also
 
 
 Transportation in Jacksonville, Florida

References

External links

Expressways in Duval County, Florida
U.S. Route 1